Sahasinaka is a municipality in the Manakara district of the Fitovinany Region in Madagascar.

This municipality is situated at 42 Km north-west from Manakara.
It lies at the Faraony River and Fangorinana River and the Fianarantsoa-Côte Est railway that links the town with Fianarantsoa and Manakara.

Agriculture
The economy is based on agriculture.  Rice and coffee are grown, new is the plantation of cloves.
For the local consumption also manioc is planted.

Sights
The viaduct of the Fianarantsoa-Côte Est railway and the Faraony River waterfalls at a distance of 4km.

References

Populated places in Fitovinany